The siege of Antioch took place when the Sassanids under Shapur I besieged the Roman city of Antioch in 253 after defeating the Romans in the Battle of Barbalissos.

References 

Antioch 253
Antioch 253
Antioch 253
253
Antioch 253
250s in the Roman Empire
3rd century in Iran
Antioch 253
Sieges of Antioch